The former church building of Episcopal Church of the Redeemer, built in 1894, is an historic Carpenter Gothic church located at 20 East Pleasant Street in Avon Park, Florida, United States. In 1989, it was listed in A Guide to Florida's Historic Architecture, published by the University of Florida Press.

The church is an active parish in the Episcopal Diocese of Central Florida and now holds services at 910 West Martin Road.

References

Churches in Highlands County, Florida
Episcopal church buildings in Florida
Carpenter Gothic church buildings in Florida
Churches completed in 1894
19th-century Episcopal church buildings
Avon Park, Florida
1894 establishments in Florida